Vania King and Laura Robson were the defending champions, but neither player chose to participate.

Ellen Perez and Arina Rodionova won the title, defeating Irina Khromacheva and Maryna Zanevska in the final, 6–4, 6–3.

Seeds

Draw

Draw

References

External Links
Main Draw

Burnie International - Doubles
Burnie International